Indira Terrero Letuce (born 29 November 1985) is a Spanish sprinter who specializes in the 400 metres. Earlier she represented her native Cuba.

Career
Her personal best time is 51.00 seconds, achieved in May 2007 in Havana.

Personal best
Outdoor
100 m: 11.70 s (wind: -1.9 m/s) –  Cáceres, 29 June 2011
200 m: 23.80 s (wind: +0.0 m/s) –  Camagüey, 14 March 2009
400 m: 50.98 s A –  Cali, 4 July 2008
800 m: 2:03.24 min –  San Fernando, 6 June 2010
Indoor
200 m: 23.92 s –  Valencia, 26 January 2013
400 m: 52.02 s –  Metz, 24 February 2013

Achievements

References

External links

Tilastopaja biography

1985 births
Living people
Cuban female sprinters
Spanish female sprinters
Cuban emigrants to Spain
Athletes (track and field) at the 2007 Pan American Games
Athletes (track and field) at the 2008 Summer Olympics
Olympic athletes of Cuba
European Athletics Championships medalists
Pan American Games medalists in athletics (track and field)
Pan American Games gold medalists for Cuba
Pan American Games bronze medalists for Cuba
Medalists at the 2007 Pan American Games
Olympic female sprinters